Rajesh Rathod  (born 5 June 2003) is an Indian politician belonging to the Indian National Congress. He is member of Maharashtra Legislative Council and also served as member of Zilla Parishad. He got elected to the Legislative Council by MLA's unopposed on 24 May 2020, along with 9 others. He is son of former MLA Dhondiram Harinayak Rathod.

Early life 
Rathod hails from Umerkheda village in Mantha Taluka of Jalna district, his father Dhondiram Rathod was a MLA from Partur. He's married to Sindhu Rathod having two daughters Riya and Rahi.

Political career 
Rathod is a three-time Zila Parishad member and a youth congress worker, working as a secretary at Maharashtra Pradesh Congress Committee. He also serves as NSUI District President and General Secretary of Youth Congress and is also a leader of the Banjara community in the region.

Positions held 
 Member of Legislative Council of Maharashtra 14 May 2020

References

1978 births
Living people
Indian National Congress politicians from Maharashtra
People from Jalna district
Members of the Maharashtra Legislative Council